Zygoballus incertus is a species of jumping spider which occurs in Panama.

History and taxonomy
The species was first described from a female specimen by the entomologist Nathan Banks in 1929 as Atelurius incertus. Arachnologist Arthur M. Chickering described the species, including a male allotype, in his 1946 paper, "The Salticidae (Spiders) of Panama". Chickering expressed doubts about whether the species belonged to Atelurius: "I am unable to come to any decision as to the correct placement of this species... I know nothing better to do with it for the present than to retain it here pending further knowledge." In 1987, arachnologist María Elena Galiano reassigned Chickering's male allotype to Sassacus. Regarding the female type specimen, she remarked that it was "without a doubt fissidentate, and should be excluded from [Atelurius]." Citing the fact that Chickering noted similarities with Zygoballus, Galiano transferred the species out of Atelurius and into Zygoballus. Characteristics of the male were described in 1996 by Wayne Maddison.

References

External links

Zygoballus incertus at Worldwide database of jumping spiders
Zygoballus incertus at Global Species Database of Salticidae (Araneae)
Zygoballus incertus at Salticidae: Diagnostic Drawings Library

Salticidae
Endemic fauna of Panama
Spiders of Central America
Spiders described in 1929
Taxa named by Nathan Banks